Jim Wieder is an American business owner, retired television and radio news anchor, former chamber of commerce executive in the East Bay of Northern California. Currently, Jim is owner of Discount Products 1.

Broadcasting career

Wieder, born in Brooklyn, New York is the son of immigrants from Budapest, Hungary. His broadcasting career spanned more than 30-years in Television and Radio. Wieder joined KOVR-TV and KGO-TV & Radio from 1988 until 2005. During that period, Wieder's reporting assignments included the Fall of the Berlin Wall, Loma Prieta Earthquake, numerous Hurricanes including Hurricane Katrina, and conflicts including Operation Desert Storm, and the 9/11 attack. In 2003, Wieder was awarded the Edward Murrow Award of the Overseas Press Club of America for reporting excellence during Operation Iraqi Freedom for his reporting to ABC News Radio.

Business career

In 2006, Wieder purchased Hayward Ace Hardware after training with the Contra Costa County Small Business Development Council. In 2007, Wieder completed Top Gun ACE retailer training and earned Ace Vision 21 status for superior sales and customer service. In 2008, Hayward Ace earned A+ ratings by several sources including the Better Business Bureau. That same year, Wieder was appointed president and CEO of the Hayward Chamber of Commerce and retained that post until 2010. Wieder was on the Chabot College Foundation Board of Directors from 2008 to 2011. In 2021, Wieder closed Hayward Hardware and started Discount Products 1.

References

Further reading
 http://articles.latimes.com/1991-10-05/local/me-3236_1_actress-rebecca-schaeffer
 http://www.mercurynews.com/crime-courts/ci_25957949/hayward-police-bike-patrol-adds-officer
 http://www.ktvu.com/news/4317372-story

Television anchors from San Francisco
Year of birth missing (living people)
Living people
People from Hayward, California
Businesspeople from the San Francisco Bay Area
American people of Hungarian-Jewish descent
Journalists from New York (state)
ABC News personalities
Radio personalities from San Francisco
American male journalists
Television anchors from Sacramento, California